The 1991–92 season of competitive football (soccer) in Lithuania was the second season since the nation regained its independence from the Soviet Union in 1991. In the Premier League, named A Lyga, fourteen teams competed, with FK Žalgiris Vilnius winning the title.

A Lyga

Final table

Results

1 Lyga

See also
 1992 in Lithuanian football

References
RSSSF

LFF Lyga seasons
1991 in Lithuanian football
1992 in Lithuanian football
Lith